Anarsia sibirica is a moth of the family Gelechiidae. It is native to Russia (in the southern Ural and Siberia).

References

sibirica
Moths of Asia
Moths described in 1996
Moths of Europe